Canada competed at the 1908 Summer Olympics in London, United Kingdom.

Medalists

Results by event

Athletics

Running

Jumping

Throwing

Cycling

Canada's best cycling result was a bronze medal won in the team pursuit.

Diving

Fencing

Canada's lone épéeist was eliminated in the first round

Gymnastics

Lacrosse

Canada won the only lacrosse match played in 1908 against Great Britain, earning the gold medal.

Rowing

Shooting

Swimming

Tennis

Wrestling

Notes

References

sports-reference
 
 

Nations at the 1908 Summer Olympics
1908
Olympics